The American Pop Corn Company is a family owned popcorn producer. Founded in 1914, it is the oldest popcorn company in the United States. Its only brand, Jolly Time, is sold globally and in every state in America. It employs 185 people, and its headquarters are in Sioux City, Iowa.

History
The American Pop Corn Company's founder, Cloid H. Smith, made many business ventures during his youth; unsatisfied with the price pop corn from his farm was being sold, he decided to sell his own.

He first began his popcorn business in the basement of his home in Schaller, Iowa with the help of his son Howard.

Business was so successful that he immediately built a crib in 1914 and a shelling and cleaning building in 1915.

A major concern in the early history of the popcorn industry was packaging. Popcorn packaged in cardboard lost its popping quality, and glass was impractical. In 1924, Jolly Time transitioned metal cans which were ideal for sealing in moisture.
This led to Jolly Time's "Guaranteed to Pop" slogan. Several factors led to the continued economic growth of the American Popcorn Company and the pop corn industry in general during the 1930s and 1940s. As more people gathered around radios, movie theaters and television sets, Jolly Time often met the demand for the perfect snack food. Also, popcorn was a cheap food for those living during the Great Depression, yet this did not damage pop corn's imaging during the economic boom following World War II. In 1953, the Floyd River flooded and much of Sioux City was under water. Cloid's grandson and future president of the company, Wrede Smith headed a project with the Sioux City Chamber of Commerce to rechannel the river. The project took three years and cost $19.6 million.
Due to an increase in competition, The American Pop Corn Company tried to strengthen the Jolly Time Brand through new marketing strategies. They hired celebrity spokespeople such as Danny Kaye, Bob Hope, and Ozzie and Harriet Nelson, and advertised on game shows such as "Let's Make a Deal." Following the industry trend, Jolly Time transitioned to the plastic bag for packaging.

The introduction of the microwave oven revolutionized the pop corn industry. This effect, along with a new strategy of selling Jolly Time in Europe resulted in an increase in sales and the building of another plant.

Today, The American Pop Corn Company is run by the fourth generation of the Smith family with the fifth generation also employed. They sold their one-billionth bag of microwave popcorn in 2003. Their address is a reflection on their product and their work culture... One Fun Place, Sioux City, Iowa 51108.

In the news
In responses to a complaint of a Colorado man who developed a respiratory illness from inhaling microwave popcorn fumes on a twice-daily basis, Jolly Time no longer contains diacetyl. This chemical occurs naturally in foods such as butter, cheese, and fruits and is safe for consumption.

See also

 List of popcorn brands

References

Homepage
Jolly Time Official site

Privately held companies based in Iowa
Popcorn brands
Companies based in Iowa
American companies established in 1914
Food and drink companies established in 1914
Food and drink companies based in Iowa
Family-owned companies of the United States